The Budlong Creek flows into the Mohawk River near Utica, New York.

References 

Rivers of Herkimer County, New York
Mohawk River
Rivers of New York (state)
Rivers of Oneida County, New York